Luis Yáñez (born October 25, 1988) is an American professional boxer. As an amateur, he won a gold medal at the 2007 Pan American Games at junior flyweight and competed at the 2008 Summer Olympics.

Amateur career
Southpaw Yanez who hails from Duncanville, Texas was a hyperactive kid who was taken to the gym by his father in 1997 at the age of 8 when he had trouble getting his son to listen and settle down. He wanted him to receive structure, release energy in a positive environment and instill discipline.

When Yanez was 14, he started compiling referrals from school administrators for disrupting class. After he had received 30 referrals, his coach Rodarte gave him an ultimatum to straighten up in school or he wouldn't be able to come to the gym.

Yanez won a silver medal at the Cadet(U17) World Championships in 2005 and a gold medal at the Junior Olympics. In 2006 he became the US champion and won the National Golden Gloves, in 2007 he repeated both wins.

In Brazil at the PanAm games 2007 he reached the final by beating two opponents who had beaten him earlier the same year – Cuba's Yampier Hernandez in the quarterfinals and Dominican Wilton Mendez in the semifinals and also bested Venezuelan Kevin Betancourt, ranked 58th in the world for the gold medal.

He won the US Olympic trials in August 2007.

Yanez didn't lose a fight in US Open competition, going 92-0. In the past three years, he's 26-3 in international competition.

In August 2007, Yanez became the first boxer ever from Dallas, TX. to qualify for the Olympics.  He was the third boxer from the Dallas/Ft. Worth area, behind Donald Curry and Sergio Reyes of Ft. Worth. At the 2007 World Amateur Boxing Championships in Chicago he qualified for the Olympics for good but lost surprisingly to fellow southpaw and eventual silver medalist Harry Tanamor from the Philippines.

In November 2007, Yanez earned his ticket into the 2008 Olympics by "advancing to the quarterfinals of the AIBA World Championships in Chicago." In a bout against Australia's Stephen Sutherland, the referee was forced to stop the fight in the second round after Yanez caused three standing eight counts. With this win, Yanez earned his official place as a light flyweight (106 pounds) in the 2008 Olympics to be hosted in Beijing, China.  At the meeting in China in November 2007 he was soundly defeated by world champ Zou Shiming.

On July 16, 2008, Yanez was reinstated to the U.S. Olympic team after having been removed to the team for missing three weeks of training camp in Colorado.  On August 13, 2008 Yanez won his first bout against Kelvin de la Nieve of Spain. The final score recorded reflected Yanez in the lead, outscoring de la Nieve 12-9.
Then he lost to eventual Mongolian runner-up Pürevdorjiin Serdamba 7:8.

Professional career

Following the 2008 Olympics, Yanez announced that he would turn professional.  His first professional fight took place on Friday, February 20 versus Julio Cesar Valadez of San Antonio at the American Airlines Center in Dallas, Texas. Yanez won his professional debut by majority decision.

Yanez will begin his professional career fighting in the bantamweight division (118 pounds), more than twelve pounds heavier than his amateur weight class of light flyweight (48 kilograms).

Professional boxing record

| style="text-align:center;" colspan="8"|7 Wins (0 knockouts, 7 decisions),  0 Losses, 1 Draws
|-  style="text-align:center; background:#e3e3e3;"
|  style="border-style:none none solid solid; "|Res.
|  style="border-style:none none solid solid; "|Record
|  style="border-style:none none solid solid; "|Opponent
|  style="border-style:none none solid solid; "|Type
|  style="border-style:none none solid solid; "|Rd., Time
|  style="border-style:none none solid solid; "|Date
|  style="border-style:none none solid solid; "|Location
|  style="border-style:none none solid solid; "|Notes
|- align=center
|Win
|7–0
|align=left| Timur Shailezov
| 
|
|
|align=left| 
|align=left|
|- align=center
|Win
|align=center|6–0||align=left| Joseph Rios
| 
|
|
|align=left| 
|align=left|
|- align=center
|Win
|align=center|5–0||align=left| Jamal Parram
|
|
|
|align=left| 
|align=left|
|- align=center
|style="background: #B0C4DE"|Draw
|align=center|4–0||align=left| Joseph Rios
|
|
|
|align=left| 
|align=left|
|- align=center
|Win
|align=center|4–0||align=left| Samuel Gutiérrez
|
|
|
|align=left| 
|align=left|
|- align=center
|Win
|align=center|3–0||align=left| José Manuel García
|
|
|
|align=left| 
|align=left|
|- align=center
|Win
|align=center|2–0||align=left| Joseph Rios
|
|
|
|align=left| 
|align=left|
|- align=center
|Win
|align=center|1–0||align=left| Julio Valadez
|
|
|
|align=left| 
|align=left|

References

External links
 BIO
 Luis Yanez Amateur Boxing Record

1988 births
Living people
Boxers from Texas
National Golden Gloves champions
Winners of the United States Championship for amateur boxers
People from Duncanville, Texas
Olympic boxers of the United States
Boxers at the 2007 Pan American Games
Boxers at the 2008 Summer Olympics
American male boxers
Pan American Games gold medalists for the United States
Pan American Games medalists in boxing
Light-flyweight boxers
Medalists at the 2007 Pan American Games